The Chicoutimi Saguenéens are a junior ice hockey team which plays in the Quebec Major Junior Hockey League (QMJHL).  The team is based out of Chicoutimi, Quebec, Canada (now a part of the city of Saguenay) and owned by the City of Saguenay. The team plays its home games at the Centre Georges-Vézina.

History
The Chicoutimi Saguenéens franchise was granted for the 1973–74 season. The team's name, Saguenéens, literally means "People from the Saguenay." The current junior team is only the most recent to use the name. The "Sags", as they are popularly nicknamed, have won the President's Cup twice in their history, in 1990–91 and in 1993–94. In both instances they advanced to the Memorial Cup, failing to advance past the round-robin stage on each occasion. The Sags also participated in the 1997 Memorial Cup, as the host Hull Olympiques had won the QMJHL title that year; the Saguenéens also did not advance past the round-robin that year.  Finally, the Centre Georges-Vézina hosted Memorial Cup festivities in 1988, but the team did not participate as then-current QMJHL rules forced the host team to make it to at least the President's Cup final, which the Saguenéens did not do in that year.

Yearly results
Legend: OTL = Overtime loss, SL = Shootout loss

Playoffs

Players

NHL alumni

Ramzi Abid
Joel Baillargeon
Ľuboš Bartečko
Marc Bergevin
Daniel Berthiaume
Nicolas Blanchard
Michel Bolduc
Pierre-Marc Bouchard
François Breault
Julien Brouillette
Paul Brousseau
Marc Bureau
Guy Carbonneau
Stéphane Charbonneau
Denis Chassé
Alain Côté
Patrick Coulombe
Glen Cressman
Laurent Dauphin
Gilbert Delorme
Marc Denis
Nicolas Deschamps
David Desharnais
Gord Donnelly
Daniel Doré
Jeff Drouin-Deslauriers
Luc Dufour
Éric Fichaud
Marc Fortier
Éric Gélinas
Christopher Gibson
David Gosselin
Denis Hamel
Gilles Hamel
Alan Haworth
Yves Héroux
Charles Hudon
Chris Langevin
Steve Larouche
Alain Lemieux
Normand Léveillé
Daniel Marois
Stéphane Morin
Alain Nasreddine
Jean-Gabriel Pageau
Pierre-Alexandre Parenteau
Félix Potvin
Daniel Poulin
Yves Preston
Jean-Marc Richard
Stéphane Richer
Antoine Roussel
André Roy
Nicolas Roy
Stéphane Roy
German Rubtsov
Lukáš Sedlák
Louis Sleigher
Sam St. Laurent
Radoslav Suchý
Bob Sullivan
Jimmy Waite

Retired numbers
 14 – Alain Côté
 16 – Normand Leveille
 18 – Sylvain Locas
 20 – Marc Fortier
 21 – Guy Carbonneau
 29 – Félix Potvin

References

External links
Official site

Ice hockey teams in Quebec
Quebec Major Junior Hockey League teams
Sport in Saguenay, Quebec
1973 establishments in Quebec
Ice hockey clubs established in 1973